The Utah National Guard comprises both Army and Air National Guard components. The Constitution of the United States specifically charges the National Guard with dual federal and state missions. The National Guard is the only United States military force empowered to function in a state status.

The Utah Army National Guard  maintains 30 armories in 27 communities.

The Utah Army National Guard is a component of the United States Army and the United States National Guard.  Nationwide, the Army National Guard comprises approximately one half of the US Army's available combat forces and approximately one third of its support organization.  National coordination of various state National Guard units are maintained through the National Guard Bureau.

Units and formations
 Joint Forces Headquarters – Utah – Draper, UT
 640th Regiment-(Regional Training Institute)- Riverton, UT
 Medical Command – Riverton, UT
 Operations Support Airlift Agency Detachment 50 (OSAAD 50) – Salt Lake City, UT
 Recruiting and Retention Command – Draper, UT
 Utah Training Center– Utah -Riverton, UT
 97th Troop Command – Draper, UT
 23rd Army Band – West Jordan, UT
 85th Civil Support Team (85th CST)(Weapons of Mass Destruction) – NSL Readiness Center, UT
 115th Maintenance Company (Support Maintenance Company) – Draper, UT
 128th Mobile Public Affairs Detachment (128th MPAD) – Draper, UT
 144th Medical Company (Area Support) – Riverton, UT
 197th Special Troops Company (197th STC)(Airborne) – Ogden, UT
 653rd Trial Defense Team (653rd TDT) -Draper, UT
 1993rd Contingency Contracting Team (1993rd CCT) -Draper, UT
 65th Field Artillery Brigade (65th FAB) – Riverton, UT
 Headquarters and Headquarters Battery (HHB) – Riverton, UT
 213th Forward Support Company (213th FSC) – Saint George, UT
 214th Forward Support Company (214th FSC) – Tooele, UT
 1st Battalion, 145th Field Artillery Regiment (1-145th FAR) – Spanish Fork, UT
 Headquarters and Headquarters Battery (HHB) – Spanish Fork, UT
 Battery A – Brigham City, UT
 Battery B – Manti, UT
 Battery C – Spanish Fork, UT
 2nd Battalion, 222nd Field Artillery Regiment (2-222nd FAR) – Cedar City, UT
 Headquarters and Headquarters Battery (HHB) – Cedar City, UT
 Battery A – Richfield, UT
 Battery B – Saint George, UT
 Battery C – Beaver, UT
 1st Battalion, 19th Special Forces Group (Airborne) – Riverton, UT
 Headquarters and Headquarters Company (HHC) – Riverton, UT
 Company B – Riverton, UT
 REC – Riverton, UT
 Support Company (1st Battalion) – Riverton, UT
 Support Company (19th SFGA) – Riverton, UT
 300th Military Intelligence Brigade (300th MIB) – Draper, UT
 Headquarters and Headquarters Company (HHC) – Draper, UT
 141st Military Intelligence Battalion (141st MIB) – Orem, UT
 Headquarters and Headquarters Company (HHC) – Orem, UT
 Company A – Draper, UT
 Company B – Orem, UT
 Company C – Orem, UT
 Company D – Saint George, UT
 142nd Military Intelligence Battalion (142nd MIB) – NSL Readiness Center, UT
 Headquarters and Headquarters Company (HHC) – NSL Readiness Center, UT
 Company A – Draper, UT
 Company B – Ogden, UT
 Company C – Draper, UT
 Company D – Logan, UT
 97th Aviation Troop Command (97th ATC) – West Jordan, UT
1st Battalion, 211th Aviation Regiment – West Jordan, UT
 Headquarters and Headquarters Company (HHC) – West Jordan, UT
 Company A – West Jordan, UT
 Company B – West Jordan, UT
 Company C – West Jordan, UT
 Company D – West Jordan, UT
 Company E – West Jordan, UT
 2nd Battalion, 211th Aviation Regiment (General Support) – West Jordan, UT
 Headquarters and Headquarters Company (HHC) – West Jordan, UT
 Company A – West Jordan, UT
 Company D – West Jordan, UT
 Company E – West Jordan, UT
 Company G – West Jordan, UT
 204th Maneuver Enhancement Brigade (204th MEB) – Riverton, UT
 Headquarters and Headquarters Company (HHC) – Riverton, UT
 115th Engineer Detachment (Facilities) – Riverton, UT
 217th Signal Company (Network Support)
 489th Brigade Support Battalion (489th BSB)– Lehi, UT
 Headquarters and Headquarters Company Detachment (HHCD)– Lehi, UT
 Company A (Distribution) – Spanish Fork, UT
 Company B (Maintenance) – Riverton, UT
 1457th Engineer Battalion – American Fork, UT
 Headquarters and  Headquarters Company (HHC) – American Fork, UT
 Company A (Forward Support) – American Fork, UT
 116th Engineer Company (Horizontal Construction) (-) – Spanish Fork, UT
 116th Engineer Company (Horizontal Construction) Detachment 1 – Mount Pleasant, UT
 118th Engineer Company (Sapper) (-) – NSL Readiness Center, UT
 118th Engineer Company (Sapper) Detachment 1 – Blanding, UT
 624th Engineer Company (Vertical Construction) (-) – Springville, UT
 624th Engineer Company (Vertical Construction) Detachment 1 – Price, UT
 624th Engineer Company (Vertical) Detachment 2 – Vernal, UT

History
In one sense the Utah Army National Guard was originally formed in 1849. In 1847, as Mormon settlers began arriving in what become known as Utah, it was realized that some sort of militia would be needed to protect the new settlements. The core of this new militia were former members of the Nauvoo Legion, which was formed in Nauvoo, Illinois around 1840. For a number of years members of the Utah-based militia could be seen wearing elements of the old Nauvoo Legion uniforms. This new Utah based militia would also be referred to as the Nauvoo Legion.  Some of the Utah-based Nauvoo Legion would carry lances, giving them a unique look when on horseback. Members of the Mormon Battalion, after finally arriving in Utah after the end of the Mexican–American War, would also join the new Nauvoo Legion.

The Nauvoo Legion was necessarily involved in the would-be conflict between Mormons and Federal forces sent to Utah in the late 1850s. After it was apparent no major hostilities would break out, a somewhat more conciliatory relationship developed between Federal troops and the Legion.

In 1857 the honorable reputation of the Utah-based Nauvoo Legion took a blow when Nauvoo Legion members in Iron County participated in the murder of 120 immigrants moving through Utah to California. This event is known as the Mountain Meadows massacre. The Utah-based Nauvoo Legion participated in numerous efforts to quell problems with Indians, and also did certain protective duties in Utah during the Civil War.

As non-Mormon settlers and U.S. Government officials began to grow in numbers, it was perceived that the Nauvoo Legion was loyal mainly to the LDS church and Brigham Young, and not to the Utah territorial government. This perception was more acute after Brigham Young was removed as the territorial governor and a non-Mormon replaced him. The Utah militia was disbanded around 1887, and for a time a more direct control over any military matters was maintained directly by the Federal government. In 1894 the Utah National Guard was created, and since that time has operated in a purely secular manner. The Militia Act of 1903 organized the various state militias into the present National Guard system.

See History of the United States National Guard for a more complete history of the guard at a national level.

On January 19, 2021, the Utah National Guard, in cooperation with the Utah Department of Health, administrated COVID-19 vaccinations to Guard members and the civilian population. A team of Utah National Guard soldiers and Airmen administrated vaccines to civilians that are 70 years or older in Utah County. Captain Jeremy Metzger said they administrated 1,400 vaccines at one of their locations.

Historic units
  115th Engineer Battalion
  140th Field Artillery Regiment
  145th Field Artillery Regiment
  222nd Field Artillery Regiment

See also

 Utah State Defense Force
 Militia
 36th Combat Aviation Brigade—approx. 40 Utah ARNG soldiers deployed to Iraq with the 36th CAB in Sep 2006.
 Transformation of the Army National Guard

References

External links

Utah National Guard's Official Homepage
 GlobalSecurity.org Utah Army National Guard, accessed 28 Nov 2006
 Unit Designations in the Army Modular Force, accessed 23 Nov 2006

United States Army National Guard by state
Military in Utah